Yasser al-Azmeh (born 16 May 1942) is a prominent Syrian writer and actor of television and theater from Damascus. He is a member of the highly notable Al-Azmeh Damascene family. Al-Azmeh is best known for the popular comedy series Maraya which was filmed from 1982–2013 for a total of 20 seasons.

Biography
Although al-Azmeh has had several other television roles, he is best remembered for his roles in Maraya. al-Azmeh won three awards on three occasions in the Cairo International Film Festival for his roles in Maraya, in addition to an honorary award from the Arab Actor's Guild.

References

1942 births
Living people
People from Damascus
Syrian male television actors
20th-century Syrian male actors
Al-Azma family
Naturalized citizens of the United Arab Emirates